Legend of Zu Mountain (Chinese: 蜀山战纪之剑侠传奇) is a 2015 Chinese television series starring William Chan, Zanilia Zhao and Nicky Wu. It is adapted from the novel Legend of the Swordsmen of the Mountains of Shu written by Huanzhulouzhu. The series premiered on iQiyi on 22 September 2015.

Synopsis
Mt Shu is the pugilistic world's number 1 sect for many years. In order to protect the world from harm, the Sect Leader Zhuge Yuwo placed the enchanted gem into Ding Yin's body to prevent the green-clothed reverent, Shangguan Jingwo from stealing it over. Ding Yin then later went under Mt Shu to practice his sword skills, aiming to be Mt Shu's best disciple and seek revenge on Lu Pao. He meets Lu Pao's daughter, Yu Wuxin, by chance and realizes that she looks exactly like his deceased wife. The two fell in love. At the same time, the inner conflicts within Mt Shu starts to unravel itself, and a disaster is about to fall upon the pugilistic world. Ding Yin, together with his sect mates Dan Chenzi, Zhuge Ziying, Zhou Qingyun and his sworn brother Xiaozhang, set on a journey to prevent the disasters from happening. However, they instead fall into a more sinister plot, leading to everyone's relationships to fall apart.

Cast

Main 
 William Chan as Ding Da Li / Ding Yin
Xiao Ru's first male disciple. Yu Wuxin’s husband. 
 Nicky Wu as Lu Pao / Shangguan Jingwo
Chief of the Fiery Shadow Holy Clan, Yu Wuxin and Tu Meng's father, Su Yin's husband and Tu Mei's love interest.
 Zanilia Zhao as Yu Wuxin
 Daughter of Shangguan Jingwo and Su Yin, Ding Yin's wife and Tu Meng's half-sister. 
 Janice Man as Xiao Xi / Zhou Qingyun Ziying's junior sister, Xiao Ru's disciple.
 Vengo Gao as Dan Chengzi Reverend Zhuge Yuwo's senior disciple and Ziying's lover.
 Ye Zuxin as Zhang Xianbing 
 Liu Sitong as Zhuge Ziying Reverend Zhuge Yuwo's daughter, Qingyun's senior sister and Xiao Ru's senior disciple.
 Jia Xiaochen as Tu Mei Tu Ba's sister and Tu Meng's mother.
Vice Chief of the Fiery Shadow Holy Clan.
 Louis Fan as Gongsun Wuwo / Person in the Mountain
 Zhang Tianlin as Tu Ba Tu Mei's brother, Tu Meng's biological uncle and adoptive father.
 Han Yuqin as Su Yin / Empty Handed Immortal Healer
Shangguan Jingwo's wife, Yu Wuxin's mother and Tu Meng's teacher. Xiao Ru's junior sister.
 Wei Chun Guang as Miao Yi
 Li Jinrong as Zhuge Yuwo Ziying's father, Dan Chengzi's teacher.
 Wu Huaxin as Nine Poison Deity Lord Member of the Fiery Shadow Holy Clan and Lu Pao's Right Hand Protector. 
 Cui Zhong as Bai Cao 
 Wu Xiaoli as Xiao Ru Head of Qi Xia Peak, Ziying, Qingyun and Ding Yin's teacher. Su Yin's senior sister.
 Wang Xichao as Five Ghost Heavenly King An old friend of Tu Mei from Western Region, Lu Pao's Left Hand Protector.

Supporting

 Yu Yue as Tu Meng Shangguan Jingwo and Tu Mei's daughter, Yu Wuxin's half-sister, Tu Ba's biological niece and adoptive daughter.
 Sun Dongan as Zhang Qi Miao Yi's disciple.
 Zhang Yeshi as Reverend Tong Yuang Qi Senior disciple of Wu Dang sect from 24 years. Later, become a sect leader of Wu Dang sect.
 He Zhonghua as Sect Leader Zuo Jing 
 Zong Fengyan as Reverend Tai Qing
 Wang Yifei as the soul of Qing Su sword
 Liu Xushi as Ah Qing Gongsun Wuwo's disciple. 
 Xing Luodan as Su Yang Gongsun Wuwo's disciple. He died by Tu Mei's poison of being accused a traitor on Mt. Zu.
 Lan Tian as Wu Xiacao Bai Cao's disciple.
 Zhu Fengshi as Lin Tianyi Hui'er's husband. Second-command leader of the bandits.
 Li Ruoci as Hui'er Lin Tianyi's wife. 
 Wang Bin as Ma Yuan Long Leader of the bandits.
 Yang Shizhen as Xiao Wu
 Huang Shichao as Zhu Zi
 Li Liuli as Madam Fan/Fan Xiao Xue Zhou Qingyun's birth mother, Zhou Ao Ran's wife and owner of Tao Ran residence. 
 Zhang Jiachuan as Zhou Ao Ran Zhou Qingyun's birth father and Fan Xiao Xue's late husband.
 Zhu Rongrong as Yun Chong Xue
 Guo Ruixi as Yu Ming Niang Xiao Dian's mother, Qing Chong Mountain's master.
 Yuan Bingyan as Xiao Dian Yu Ming Niang's daughter.

Soundtrack
1st Season 

2nd season 

3rd season 

4th season 

5th season

Ratings 

 Highest ratings are marked in red, lowest ratings are marked in blue

International broadcast
  Thailand - ONE 
  Indonesia - RTV 
  Malaysia - Astro
  Singapore - VV Drama, Jia Le Channel
  Philippines - GMA Network
  India - Sony TV (Hindi), Star Vijay (Tamil), Asianet (Malayalam), Star Maa (Telugu)

References

2015 Chinese television series debuts
2016 Chinese television series endings
Mandarin-language television shows
Television shows based on Chinese novels
Xianxia television series
IQIYI original programming
Anhui Television original programming